The 2006 United States Senate election in Ohio was held November 7, 2006. Incumbent Republican Mike DeWine ran for re-election, but was defeated by Democratic congressman Sherrod Brown. Following his defeat, DeWine would later successfully run for attorney general in 2010 and 2014 and governor of Ohio in 2018 and 2022.

Background 
The incumbent Republican Senator R. Michael DeWine had approval ratings at 38%, making him the second most unpopular U.S. Senator behind Pennsylvania Republican Rick Santorum, who was also up for reelection in 2006. Pre-election stories in the U.S. media suggested that the national Republican Party may have given up on saving Senator DeWine's Senate seat before election day. Sherrod Brown, former Ohio Secretary of State and U.S. Representative from Ohio's 13th district, easily won the Democratic nomination over Merrill Keiser Jr.

Democratic primary

Candidates

Declared
 Sherrod Brown, U.S. Representative
 Merrill Keiser Jr., trucking business owner/operator and Vietnam War veteran

Withdrew
 Paul Hackett, Iraq War veteran

Results

Republican primary

Candidates 
 Mike DeWine, incumbent U.S. Senator
 David Smith, candidate for OH-02 in 2005
William G. Pierce, engineer

Campaign 
Both candidates campaigned as conservative alternatives to DeWine, citing DeWine's support for legal abortion and his role as one of the Republican members of the Gang of 14 who compromised with Democrats in a dispute about judicial appointments.

Results

General election

Campaign 
The Republican Party, which was facing multiple challenges to their Senate majority, was initially determined to assist DeWine in his competitive race while the National Democratic party supported Brown in hopes of taking control of the Senate. John McClelland, a spokesman for the Ohio Republican Party said, "It's vitally important to the Republican Party as a whole, so I think that's why you see the president coming to Ohio to support Mike DeWine." Phil Singer, a spokesman for the Democratic Senatorial Campaign Committee said, "Mike DeWine Senior is in for the fight of his life, make no mistake about it."

On July 14, 2006, DeWine's campaign began airing TV commercials depicting a smoking World Trade Center. "The senator was notified... by a reporter at U.S. News & World Report that the image of the burning Twin Towers could not have depicted the actual event because the smoke was blowing the wrong way." DeWine's campaign admitted that the video was actually a still photo of the World Trade Center with smoke digitally added. He also was criticized for using an emotionally charged image to attack his challenger.

Another of DeWine's ads suggested that opponent Sherrod Brown didn't pay his taxes for thirteen years. This claim led to the Associated Press reporting on October 19 that, "Several Ohio television stations have stopped airing a Republican ad because state documents contradict the ad's accusation that Democratic U.S. Senate candidate Sherrod Brown didn't pay an unemployment tax bill for 13 years." Brown produced a commercial citing these facts. DeWine's ads were changed to state only that he had failed to pay his unemployment taxes until legal action was taken against him.

On October 16, 2006, The New York Times reported that top national Republicans were moving resources away from the Ohio Senate race, as they had determined that DeWine was likely to lose and were seeking to spend money on races where Republican candidates were seen as having a better chance of winning.

Debates
Complete video of debate, October 1, 2006
Complete video of debate, October 13, 2006
Complete video of debate, October 19, 2006
Complete video of debate, October 27, 2006

Fundraising 
During the election cycle, DeWine raised $14.9 million and spent $15.5 million. Brown raised $8.9 million and spent $10.8 million.

Predictions

Polling

Results 
Brown was declared the winner right when the polls closed in Ohio at 7:30. DeWine had the second worst performance of a Republican incumbent in 2006; only Pennsylvania Senator Rick Santorum had a worse performance. While DeWine was able to win rural counties in western Ohio, Brown managed to win most eastern Ohio counties, especially in heavily populated areas. DeWine's narrow 2,000 vote victory in Hamilton County which is home to Cincinnati, came nowhere close to making a dent in Brown's lead. Brown would go on to be reelected to a second term in 2012, and a third term in 2018. Also in 2018, both Brown and DeWine were on the ballot but this time for different races; DeWine would be elected Governor of Ohio.

By congressional district
Sherrod Brown won 14 of 18 congressional districts, including the 1st, 5th, 7th, 12th, 14th, 15th, and 16th  districts, which elected Republicans to the House.

See also 
 2006 United States Senate elections
 2006 Ohio gubernatorial election

References

External links 
 Mike DeWine for Senate
 Sherrod Brown for Senate
 2006 Ohio Senate race profile, analysis of campaign finances by OpenSecrets.
 Senator Mike DeWine, positions and voting record, an analysis by Project Vote Smart.
 Representative Sherrod Brown positions and voting record, an analysis by Project Vote Smart.

Ohio
2006
2006 Ohio elections
Sherrod Brown